Ashville Historic District may refer to:

Ashville Historic District (Ashville, Alabama), listed on the NRHP in Alabama
Ashville Historic District (Marshall, Virginia), listed on the NRHP in Virginia

See also
Downtown Asheville Historic District, in Asheville, North Carolina, listed on the NRHP in North Carolina
West Asheville End of Car Line Historic District, in Asheville, North Carolina, listed on the NRHP in North Carolina
West Asheville-Aycock School Historic District, in Asheville, North Carolina, listed on the NRHP in North Carolina